Alburnoides bipunctatus, known vernacularly as the schneider, spirlin, bleak, riffle minnow, and others, is a species of small (9-cm average length) freshwater fish in the family Cyprinidae. It is found in Afghanistan, Armenia, Austria, Azerbaijan, Belarus, Belgium, Bulgaria, Czech Republic, Croatia, Estonia, France, Georgia, Germany, Hungary, Iran, Latvia, Lithuania, Moldova, the Netherlands, North Macedonia, Poland, Romania, Russia, Serbia, Slovakia, Slovenia, Switzerland, Turkey, Ukraine, and Uzbekistan. This fish inhabits rivers with very calm waters, and it eats dead insects and insect larvae, diatoms, and crustaceans. It reproduces during April to June.

References 

Alburnoides
Fish described in 1782
Cyprinid fish of Europe
Cyprinid fish of Asia
Fish of Afghanistan
Fish of Azerbaijan
Fish of Georgia (country)
Fish of Iran
Fish of Russia
Fish of Turkey
Fish of Central Asia
Taxonomy articles created by Polbot
Taxobox binomials not recognized by IUCN